Boccia at the 2000 Summer Paralympics consisted of individual, pairs, and team events. Men and women competed together.

Medal table

Participating nations

Medal summary

References 

 

2000 Summer Paralympics events
2000
2000 in bowls